Degrees Brix (°Bx) is a unit of measurement of sucrose in a liquid.

Brix may also refer to:

People
Aage Brix (1894–1963), American soccer player
Adolf Ferdinand Wenceslaus Brix (1798–1870), German mathematician and engineer
Aglaja Brix (born 1990), German actress
Emil Brix (born 1956), Austrian diplomat
Hermann Brix (1912–1982), Austrian stage and film actor
Kristian Brix (born 1990), Norwegian-born Gambian footballer
Mia Brix (born 1990), Danish figure skater
Joseph Le Brix (1899–1931), French aviator and naval officer
Brix Michgell (active 1612–1627), Danish carpenter and wood carver
Brix Smith Start (born 1962), American-born singer and guitarist
Bruce Bennett (1906–2007), born Herman Brix, American actor

Other uses
Brix, Manche, a small town in Normandy, France
Brix (video game), a 1992 puzzle game for the PC
Zzyzzyxx, a 1982 video game, also released as Brix
Brix (database), a database of protein fragments
Brix (comics), a fictional villain

See also
BRICS, an acronym for Brazil, Russia, India, China and South Africa
Le Brix (disambiguation)
Birx (disambiguation)